Branagan is a surname. Notable people with the surname include:

Carolyn Whitney Branagan (born 1954), American politician
Keith Branagan (born 1966), English-born Republic of Ireland footballer
Ken Branagan (born 1930), English footballer
Ritchie Peter Branagan (born 1991), English-born Republic of Ireland footballer
Jim Branagan (born 1955), English footballer

See also 
 Brannigan (disambiguation)

Anglicised Irish-language surnames